Poor Moon is the third studio album by American duo Hiss Golden Messenger. It was released in April 2012 under Tompkins Square Records

Track list

References

2012 albums
Hiss Golden Messenger albums